San Francisco Chapulapa  is a town and municipality in Oaxaca in south-western Mexico.
It is part of Cuicatlán District in the north of the Cañada Region.

As of 2005, the municipality had a total population of 1968.

References

Municipalities of Oaxaca